Pseudomonas panacis is a Gram-negative, aerobic, motile with one or more polar flagella, rod-shaped bacterium. It derives its name from the fact that it causes rusty root lesions on Korean ginseng, as the ginseng genus is Panax.

References

External links
Type strain of Pseudomonas panacis at BacDive -  the Bacterial Diversity Metadatabase

Pseudomonadales
Bacteria described in 2005